St. Stanislaus Parish is a Roman Catholic parish designated for Polish immigrants in Fall River, Massachusetts, United States.

Founded in 1903, it is one of the Polish-American Roman Catholic parishes in New England in the Diocese of Fall River. It also has a vibrant community, annual Polish festival, and a school. The students are educated not only in their faith and regular studies, but also Polish culture and language.

The Church is in the South End Neighborhood in Fall River, known for its historic Slavic communities, an example being the Ukrainian  Catholic Church, St. John the Baptist, down the street, and the famed restaurant, Pattie's Pierogi's close by. The community is steeped in tradition, and Polish or not, the parishioners, as well as the students in the school, are instilled with strong Polish ethnic and national pride.

Bibliography 
 
 The Official Catholic Directory in USA

External links 
 St. Stanislaus Parish - TheCatholicDirectory.com 
 Roman Catholic Diocese of Fall River

Polish-American Roman Catholic parishes in Massachusetts
Roman Catholic parishes of Diocese of Fall River